Corsula may refer to :

 the Croatian town and former bishopric Korčula, now a Latin Catholic titular see
 species of the fish genus Rhinomugil (shark mullet)